Gabino Lizarza (25 October 1888 – 5 July 1938) was a Spanish athlete. He competed in the men's discus throw at the 1924 Summer Olympics.

References

External links
 

1888 births
1938 deaths
Athletes (track and field) at the 1924 Summer Olympics
Spanish male discus throwers
Olympic athletes of Spain
Place of birth missing
Athletes from the Basque Country (autonomous community)
People from Tolosaldea
Sportspeople from Gipuzkoa